Makiyamaia subdeclivis is a species of sea snail, a marine gastropod mollusc in the family Clavatulidae.

Description
The length of the shell varies between 40 mm and 55 mm.

Distribution
This marine species occurs off Japan and in the South China Sea.

References

 Higo, S., Callomon, P. & Goto, Y. (1999). Catalogue and bibliography of the marine shell-bearing Mollusca of Japan. Osaka. : Elle Scientific Publications. 749 pp.

External links
 

subdeclivis
Gastropods described in 1926